Izabela Zatorska (born 6 October 1962) is a Polish female mountain runner three-time winner of the WMRA World Cup (2001, 2004, 2005).

Biography
Before becoming a mountain runner, she was a long-distance runner, among her achievements she also won 1991 Roma-Ostia Half Marathon.

References

External links
 Izabela Zatorska profile at Association of Road Racing Statisticians
 Izabela Zatorska profile at All-Athletics

1962 births
Living people
Polish mountain runners
Polish female marathon runners
Polish masters athletes
People from Nysa County
20th-century Polish women
21st-century Polish women